David Andrew Sinclair  (born June 26, 1969) is an Australian-American biologist and academic known for his research on aging and epigenetics. Sinclair is a professor of genetics at Harvard Medical School and is the co-director of its Paul F. Glenn Center for Biology of Aging Research. He is an officer of the Order of Australia (AO).

Sinclair has appeared in Time magazine, The New York Times, The Charlie Rose Show, 60 Minutes, Boston magazine, The Washington Post, The Economist, TED and The Joe Rogan Experience.

Early life and education
David Andrew Sinclair was born in Australia in 1969, and he grew up in St Ives, New South Wales. His paternal grandmother had emigrated to Australia following the suppression of the Hungarian Uprising of 1956, and his father changed the family name from Szigeti to Sinclair. Sinclair studied at the University of New South Wales, Sydney, obtaining a BSc in biochemistry with honours in 1991 and a Ph.D. in molecular genetics in 1995, focusing on gene regulation in yeast. He also won the Australian Commonwealth Prize.

Career
In 1993, he met Leonard P. Guarente, a Massachusetts Institute of Technology professor who studied genes involved in the regulation of aging, when Guarente was on a lecture tour in Australia, and the meeting spurred Sinclair to apply for a post-doc position in Guarente's lab. Earlier that year Cynthia Kenyon's lab at UCSF had discovered that a single-gene mutation in (Daf-2) could double the lifespan of C. elegans.

In 1999, after four years of working as a postdoctoral researcher for Guarente, Sinclair was hired at Harvard Medical School. In 2003, his lab was small and struggling for funding. In 2004, Sinclair met with the philanthropist Paul F. Glenn who donated $5 million to Harvard to establish the Paul F. Glenn Laboratories for the Biological Mechanisms of Aging at Harvard, of which Sinclair became the founding director. He currently serves as the co-director with Bruce Yankner.

In 2004, Sinclair, along with serial entrepreneur Andrew Perlman, Christoph Westphal, Richard Aldrich, Richard Pops, and Paul Schimmel, founded Sirtris Pharmaceuticals. Sirtris was focused on developing Sinclair's research into activators of sirtuins, work that began in the Guarente lab. The company was specifically focused on resveratrol formulations and derivatives as activators of the SIRT1 enzyme; Sinclair became known for making statements about resveratrol like: "(It's) as close to a miraculous molecule as you can find. ... One hundred years from now, people may be taking these molecules on a daily basis to prevent heart disease, stroke, and cancer." Most of the anti-aging field was more cautious, especially with regard to what else resveratrol might do in the body and its lack of bioavailability. The company's initial product was called SRT501, and was a formulation of resveratrol. Sirtris went public in 2007 and was subsequently purchased and made a subsidiary of GlaxoSmithKline in 2008 for $720 million. Five years later, GSK shuttered the Sirtris program without successful drug development.

In 2006, Genocea Biosciences was founded based on work of Harvard scientist Darren E. Higgins around antigens that stimulate T cells and the use of these antigens to create vaccines; Sinclair was a co-founder. Genocea laid off most of its workforce in 2022 after presenting disappointing data at AACR

In 2008, Sinclair was promoted to tenured professor at Harvard Medical School. A few years later, he also became a conjoint professor at the School of Medical Sciences at the University of New South Wales.

In 2008, Sinclair joined the scientific advisory board of Shaklee and helped them devise and introduce a product containing resveratrol called "Vivix"; after the Wall Street Journal requested an interview about his work with the company and its marketing, he disputed the use of his name and words to promote the supplement, and resigned.

In 2011, Sinclair was a co-founder of OvaScience with Michelle Dipp (who had been involved with Sirtris), Aldrich, Westphal, and Jonathan Tilly, based on scientific work done by Tilly concerning mammalian oogonial stem cells and work on mitochondria by Sinclair. Tilly's work was controversial, with some groups unable to replicate it. The company ultimately came under pressure for skirting US regulatory authorities for fertility testing.

In 2011, Sinclair was also a co-founder of CohBar, along with Nir Barzilai and other colleagues. CohBar aimed to discover and develop novel peptides derived from mitochondria. Cohbar describes itself as a clinical stage biotechnology company but has no drug candidates in clinical testing.

In 2015, Sinclair described to The Scientist his efforts to get funding for his lab, how his lab grew to around 20 people, shrank back down to about 5, and then grew again as he brought in funding from philanthropic organizations and companies, including companies that he helped to start. In 2015, his lab had 22 people and was supported by one R01 grant and was 75% funded by non-federal funds. However, as of 2016, this was no longer true as his federal funding began to increase.

In September 2019, Sinclair published Lifespan: Why We Age – and Why We Don't Have To, a New York Times bestseller, co-written with journalist Matthew LaPlante and translated into 18 languages. This was also released as an audiobook on Audible and read by Sinclair. Sinclair broadly discusses his longevity practices on social media and includes them in his book. They include daily doses of nicotinamide mononucleotide (NMN) and resveratrol, which Sinclair says are activators of SIRT1. In November 2022, Sinclair's company Metro Biotech successfully urged the FDA to take actions to take NMN off the market as a supplement because Metro Biotech had registered NMN and publicized NMN as an investigational new drug.

Research
Sinclair has expressed the view that there is no limit to human aging, that we are the same as whales, and that there is a backup copy of the genetic and epigenetic information in us.

While Sinclair was in Guarente's lab, he discovered that sirtuin 1 (called sir2 in yeast) slows aging in yeast by reducing the accumulation of extrachromosomal rDNA circles. Others working in the lab at the time identified NAD as an essential cofactor for sirtuin function. In 2002, after he had left for Harvard, he clashed with Guarente at a scientific meeting at Cold Spring Harbor Laboratory, challenging Guarante's description of how sir2 might be involved in aging; this set off a scientific rivalry.

In 2003, when his lab was still small, Sinclair learned that scientists at a Pennsylvania biotech company called Biomol Research Laboratories discovered that polyphenols including resveratrol could activate sir2, and he collaborated with them to confirm this. This led to publications authored in part by Sinclair in both Nature and Science in 2003. Sinclair's outspoken advocacy for resveratrol as an anti-aging compound started a scientific controversy over whether this was true, and whether resveratrol even activated sirtuins. High-profile papers claiming age reversal of mice have also come under intense scrutiny. Work in another lab, done partially with funding from Sirtris, found increases in the number of mitochondria in the cells of mice given high doses of resveratrol. Sinclair's lab continued to work on resveratrol and analogues of it, as well as on mitochondria and NAD, all directed to understanding aging and how to prevent it.

In January 2023, Sinclair's lab published research in Cell on Yamanaka factors which showed a degree of artificial control over senescence and rejuvenation in mice.

Awards and honors
Sinclair has received numerous awards for his research, including the Irving S. Wright Award of Distinction from the American Federation for Aging Research in 2018, the Advance Award in Life Sciences from the Australian government in 2017, and the Australian Society for Medical Research Medal in 2014. 

In 2014, Sinclair was included in Time 100 as one of the hundred most influential people in the world, and in 2018 he was included in Time magazine's 50 Most Influential People in Health Care. In 2018, Sinclair was made an officer of the Order of Australia (AO) for "distinguished service to medical research into the biology of ageing and lifespan extension, as a geneticist and academic, to biosecurity initiatives, and as an advocate for the study of science" (2018 Australia Day Honours).

Bibliography

Books
  A New York Times bestseller (2019).

References 

Australian biologists
Australian geneticists
Australian expatriates in the United States
Australian Jews
Living people
Life extensionists
Biogerontologists
Harvard Medical School faculty
1969 births
Officers of the Order of Australia